Leonard A. McEwan (February 17, 1925 – January 24, 2008) was an American jurist who served as chief justice of the Wyoming Supreme Court.

McEwan served in the United States Army Air Corps during World War II. He received a B.S. in business and accounting from the University of Wyoming in 1955, followed by a Juris Doctor degree from the UW College of Law in 1957.

In January 1975, McEwan stepped down as Chief Justice to become a judge of the Wyoming Fourth Judicial District, following the ouster of judge John P. Ilsley in a no-confidence vote the previous November.

References

1925 births
2008 deaths
Wyoming state court judges
Wyoming lawyers
University of Wyoming alumni
Wyoming Cowboys football players
Players of American football from Montana
American Episcopalians
Politicians from Cheyenne, Wyoming
People from Sheridan, Wyoming
Deaths from diabetes
Politicians from Great Falls, Montana
United States Army Air Forces personnel of World War II
Justices of the Wyoming Supreme Court
20th-century American judges
20th-century American philanthropists